Ko Phi is a small unoccupied island near Ko Mak, in Trat Province, Thailand. 

It can be reached with a sea kayak from Ko Mak. Ko Phi has places to snorkel, depending on the direction of wind.

See also
 List of islands of Thailand

Phi
Geography of Trat province